The 2001 WCHA Men's Ice Hockey Tournament was the 42nd conference playoff in league history and 48th season where a WCHA champion was crowned. The 2001 tournament was played between March 9 and March 17, 2001, at five conference arenas and the Xcel Energy Center in St. Paul, Minnesota, the home of the NHL's Minnesota Wild. By winning the tournament, St. Cloud State was awarded the Broadmoor Trophy and received the Western Collegiate Hockey Association's automatic bid to the 2001 NCAA Men's Division I Ice Hockey Tournament. This was the inaugural year in which the Xcel Energy Center hosted the WCHA final five and it remained there until the conclusion of the 2013 tournament.

Format
The first round of the postseason tournament featured a best-of-three games format. All ten conference schools participated in the tournament with teams seeded No. 1 through No. 10 according to their final conference standing, with a tiebreaker system used to seed teams with an identical number of points accumulated. The top five seeded teams each earned home ice and hosted one of the lower seeded teams.

The winners of the first round series advanced to the Xcel Energy Center for the WCHA Final Five, the collective name for the quarterfinal, semifinal, and championship rounds. The Final Five uses a single-elimination format. Teams were re-seeded No. 1 through No. 5 according to the final regular season conference standings, with the top three teams automatically advancing to the semifinals.

Conference standings
Note: GP = Games played; W = Wins; L = Losses; T = Ties; PTS = Points; GF = Goals For; GA = Goals Against

Bracket
Teams are reseeded after the first round

Note: * denotes overtime period(s)

Quarterfinals

(1) North Dakota vs. (10) Minnesota-Duluth

(2) St. Cloud State vs. (9) Alaska-Anchorage

(3) Minnesota vs. (8) Michigan Tech

(4) Colorado College vs. (7) Minnesota State-Mankato

(5) Wisconsin vs. (6) Denver

Quarterfinal

(4) Colorado College vs. (5) Wisconsin

Semifinals

(1) North Dakota vs. (4) Colorado College

(2) St. Cloud State vs. (3) Minnesota

Third Place

(3) Minnesota vs. (4) Colorado College

Championship

(1) North Dakota vs. (2) St. Cloud State

Tournament awards

All-Tournament Team
F Jeff Panzer (North Dakota)
F Mark Cullen (Colorado College)
F Tyler Arnason* (St. Cloud State)
D Duvie Westcott (St. Cloud State)
D Travis Roche (North Dakota)
G Scott Meyer (St. Cloud State)
* Most Valuable Player(s)

See also
Western Collegiate Hockey Association men's champions

References

External links
WCHA.com
2000–01 WCHA Standings
2000–01 NCAA Standings

WCHA Men's Ice Hockey Tournament
Wcha Men's Ice Hockey Tournament